Gary James Lund (born 13 September 1964) is an English former professional footballer who scored 106 goals from 392 appearances in the Football League playing as a centre forward for Grimsby Town, Lincoln City, Notts County, Hull City and Chesterfield. He was capped by England at under-21 level.

References

1964 births
Living people
People from Cleethorpes
English footballers
England under-21 international footballers
Association football forwards
Grimsby Town F.C. players
Lincoln City F.C. players
Notts County F.C. players
Hull City A.F.C. players
Chesterfield F.C. players
English Football League players